"Numb/Encore" is a song by American rapper Jay-Z and rock band Linkin Park from their EP Collision Course (2004). It was released as a single on December 13, 2004, by Warner Bros., Machine Shop, Def Jam, and Roc-A-Fella Records. The song is a mash-up that fuses rock and hip hop, combining lyrics from "Numb" by Linkin Park and "Encore" by Jay-Z, both released in 2003.

The only single released from the album, the track went on to reach number 20 on the Billboard Hot 100. Billboard also placed the single at number 93 on their Billboard Year-End Hot 100 singles of 2005 chart. Outside the United States, the single peaked at number 14 in the United Kingdom, number five in France and the Netherlands and spent three weeks at number one in Ireland.

Background
Before Mike Shinoda formed Linkin Park in 1996, he was an experimental musician who enjoyed combining songs by Jay-Z with tracks recorded by The Smashing Pumpkins, Nine Inch Nails, and others. A couple of years later, Jay-Z had a similar idea after hearing similar mash-ups by Danger Mouse and Cheap Cologne. He contacted Shinoda's new band, Linkin Park, and suggested that they work on some material together. Linkin Park's first two albums – Hybrid Theory and Meteora – had both been worldwide successes and Jay-Z felt he could work with the band. Shinoda produced three mash-ups based on Jay-Z's The Black Album before responding by email.

Shinoda and Jay-Z continued to correspond by email but eventually met in person to discuss plans. Initially the idea was to create several mash-ups for a new show premiering on MTV called MTV Ultimate Mash-Ups in 2004. However, instead of simply reconfiguring the tracks, the two artists decided to enter the studio and re-record the raps on top of Shinoda's songs. Some of the musical elements were also altered to create an alternative sound. Both Linkin Park and Jay-Z found the session so rewarding that they believed the international audience deserved to hear the results. The songs were performed at Roxy Theatre in West Hollywood in July 2004.

"Numb/Encore" was released as a single in November that year. The song – one of six collaborations on the album – combined the Jay-Z song "Encore" (taken from his 2003 album The Black Album) and the Linkin Park song "Numb" (taken from their 2003 album Meteora). The released version also contained background vocals from Kanye West that were recorded for the original release.

Commercial performance
In the United States, "Numb/Encore" peaked at number 20 on the Billboard Hot 100, where "Numb" had charted higher at number 11. However, "Numb/Encore" didn't manage to have much airplay on modern rock stations, barely hitting the chart at number 40. As of June 2014, the song has sold 2.078 million copies in the US.

In the United Kingdom, "Numb/Encore" achieved the record for the longest stay in the top 20 without ever reaching the top 10. Despite only peaking at number 14 – the same peak that "Numb" had achieved 15 months earlier – the song has managed to spend 45 weeks in the top 100, 13 of them in the top 20.The former record has been beaten by Jason Mraz's "I'm Yours", which spent 60 weeks in the top 100. It has since sold over 1,800,000 copies and been certified 3× Platinum.

Music video
The official music video was directed by Kimo Proudfoot. It features a mix of Linkin Park and Jay-Z's performance of the song at The Roxy and behind the scenes footage, which was in black and white. The performance and most of the scenes can be found on the Collision Course DVD. However, the music video is not entirely available on the DVD.

Accolades
"Numb/Encore" won Best Rap/Sung Collaboration at the Grammy Awards of 2006. The show featured a performance of the song, during which Paul McCartney made a surprise appearance and came onto the stage to perform a duet with Chester Bennington of The Beatles' song "Yesterday". "Yesterday" replaced "Numb" after the first rap verse of the mash-up.

In popular culture
The track was featured at the beginning of the 2006 film adaptation of Miami Vice.

Track listing

Charts

Weekly

Year-end

Certifications

Notes

References

External links

2004 songs
2004 singles
Jay-Z songs
Linkin Park songs
European Hot 100 Singles number-one singles
Irish Singles Chart number-one singles
Mashup songs
Songs written by Jay-Z
Songs written by Mike Shinoda
Warner Records singles
Def Jam Recordings singles
Roc-A-Fella Records singles
Alternative hip hop songs
Grammy Award for Best Rap/Sung Collaboration